Albert Dock may refer to:
Albert Dock, Hull, in Kingston upon Hull, England
Royal Albert Dock, Liverpool, a dock and warehouse system in Liverpool, England
Royal Albert Dock, London, in the Docklands area of east London, England
Albert Dock Seamen's Hospital, a London hospital for ex members of the merchant navy